René Friedl (born 17 July 1967 in Friedrichroda) is an East German-German luger who has competed during the late 1980s and early 1990s. He won two medals in the mixed team event at the FIL World Luge Championships with a gold in 1993 and a silver in 1989.

Friedl also won four medals at the FIL European Luge Championships with three golds (Men's singles: 1992, Mixed team (1990, 1992) and one silver (Mixed team: 1994). His best overall Luge World Cup seasonal finish was second in the men's singles in 1986-7.

Friedl also finished eighth in the men's singles event at the 1992 Winter Olympics in Albertville.

Since 2005, he has been head coach of the Austrian luge team.

References
1992 luge men's singles results
Hickok sports information on World champions in luge and skeleton.
JISS database information on Friedl.
List of European luge champions 
List of men's singles luge World Cup champions since 1978.
US Olympic Committee information on Friedl's coaching position in Austria.

External links
 
 

1967 births
Living people
German male lugers
Olympic lugers of Germany
Lugers at the 1992 Winter Olympics
People from Friedrichroda
Sportspeople from Thuringia